The UK Singles Chart is one of many music charts compiled by the Official Charts Company that calculates the best-selling singles of the week in the United Kingdom. Since 2004 the chart has been based on the sales of both physical singles and digital downloads, with airplay figures excluded from the official chart.  This list shows singles that peaked in the Top 10 of the UK Singles Chart during 2007, as well as singles which peaked in 2006 and 2008 but were in the top 10 in 2007. The entry date is when the single appeared in the top 10 for the first time (week ending, as published by the Official Charts Company, which is six days after the chart is announced).

One-hundred and thirty-four singles were in the top ten in 2007. Seven singles from 2006 remained in the top 10 for several weeks at the beginning of the year. "Crank That (Soulja Boy)" by Soulja Boy Tell'em was the only single from 2007 to reach its peak in 2008. Twenty-eight artists scored multiple entries in the top 10 in 2007. Calvin Harris, Mark Ronson, Mika, OneRepublic and Scouting for Girls were among the many artists who achieved their first UK charting top 10 single in 2007.

New rules were introduced this year to alter how single downloads are counted, with a physical copy no longer having to be currently available in the shops for a single to be eligible for the charts. Snow Patrol were the most high profile act to benefit from the change, with their song "Chasing Cars" returning to the top 10, months after first release the previous year. "Baby's Coming Back"/"Transylvania" by McFly also became only the third single in chart history to fall straight from number-one out of the top ten the following week.

The 2006 Christmas number-one, "A Moment Like This" by 2006 X Factor winner Leona Lewis, remained at number-one for the first three weeks of 2007. The first new number-one single of the year was "Grace Kelly" by Mika. Overall, eighteen different singles peaked at number-one in 2007, with Leona LewisSugababes and Timbaland (2) having the joint most singles hit that position.

Background

Multiple entries
One-hundred and thirty-four singles charted in the top 10 in 2007, with one-hundred and twenty-five singles reaching their peak this year (including the re-entries "All I Want for Christmas is You" and "Fairytale of New York" which charted in previous years but reached peaks on their latest chart run).

Twenty-eight artists scored multiple entries in the top 10 in 2007. American rapper Akon, fellow countryman producer Timbaland and Lebanon-born British singer Mika shared the position of most top 10 entries in 2007 with four each, although Akon's "Smack That" - a collaboration with Eminem - peaked in 2006. Mika's debut number-one single "Grace Kelly" acted as a breakthrough for the singer, who won the BBC's Sound of 2007 poll, as he went on to record three further top 10 entries during the year ("Love Today", "Big Girl (You Are Beautiful)" and "Happy Ending").

Akon's other hit solo singles in 2007 included the number three peak "I Wanna Love You" in February and "Don't Matter" which reached the same spot in May. He also featured on the number two single "The Sweet Escape" by Gwen Stefani, just missing out on number-one in March. Timbaland had two number-one singles in 2007: "Give It to Me" featuring Nelly Furtado and Justin Timberlake in April, followed by "The Way I Are with Keri Hilson in July. His feature on 50 Cent's "Ayo Technology" (also featuring Justin Timberlake) reached number two, and "Apologize" with OneRepublic peaked one spot lower.

Three British acts in the form of Girls Aloud, Mark Ronson and Take That all achieved three top 10 entries in 2007, along with German dance group Cascada and American singer Justin Timberlake. Take That, who only returned unexpectedly as a four-piece in late 2006 following a ten-year hiatus, had a very successful year, as "Shine" was a number-one single and "Rule the World" reached number two behind Leona Lewis' "Bleeding Love" in October 2007. "Patience" had also reached number-one in 2006 and remained in the top 10 at the beginning of 2007.

Girls Aloud added another number-one to their collection: "Walk This Way", a cover of the Run DMC and Aerosmith for Comic Relief with Sugababes. "Sexy! No No No..." peaked at number five in September, while "Call the Shots" ended their year in December, reaching number three. Mark Ronson's "Stop Me" was a number two entry in April. He produced Lily Allen's cover of "Oh My God" originally by Kaiser Chiefs, which reached number eight in July, as well as Amy Winehouse's interpretation of The Zutons' "Valerie", peaking at number two in October.

Dance group Cascada's total included "Truly Madly Deeply" from the end of 2006, when it had peaked at number four. "Miracle" landed at number eight in March and "What Hurts the Most" sneaked into the top 10 in the week before Christmas. Justin Timberlake had one more entry in addition to "Give It to Me" and "Ayo Technology". "What Goes Around.../...Comes Around" made it to number four in March.

Barbadian singer Rihanna was one of a number of artists with two top-ten entries, including number-one single "Umbrella", which stayed at the top of the chart for ten weeks. Avril Lavigne, Calvin Harris, Fedde Le Grand, Gym Class Heroes, Leona Lewis, Mutya Buena, Nelly Furtado and Snow Patrol were among the other artists who had multiple top 10 entries in 2007.

Change to chart rules
The new chart rules regarding downloads, introduced at the start of the year, enabled Scottish/Irish band Snow Patrol to re-enter the top 10 with "Chasing Cars, a song that originally charted in summer 2006, without a physical copy of the record being in the shops at that time.

McFly number-one's rapid drop
"Baby's Coming Back"/"Transylvania" by McFly joined a unique club of singles whose only one week in the top 10 was at number-one. It repeated the feat of "One Night"/"I Got Stung" and "It's Now or Never", both by Elvis Presley, from 2005. It held the record for the sharpest fall from number-one until "A Bridge over You" by Lewisham and Greenwich NHS Choir (2015) took this over in 2015 - its drop to number 29 was beaten by the charity single, which fell to number 29 after one week at the top of the chart.

Chart debuts
Forty-seven artists achieved their first top 10 single in 2007, either as a lead or featured artist. Of these, five went on to record another hit single that year: Calvin Harris, The Enemy, Groove Armada, Gym Class Heroes and The Hoosiers. Mark Ronson scored two more top 10 singles in 2007. Mika had three other entries in his breakthrough year.

The following table (collapsed on desktop site) does not include acts who had previously charted as part of a group and secured their first top 10 solo single.  

Notes
Sharam from the American electronic music duo Deep Dish had his first charting top 10 in his own right when his cover of "Party All the Time" (known as "PATT (Party All the Time)") reached number eight in January 2007. Peter Kay featured on The Proclaimers new version of "I'm Gonna Be (500 Miles)" as his Phoenix Nights character Brian Potter. The Comic Relief single went to number-one and also featured Matt Lucas playing Andy Pipkin from Little Britain. Kay had previously been credited on "Is This the Way to Amarillo" in 2005, but this was his first chart hit as Potter.

Patrick Stump of Fall Out Boy featured on the Gym Class Heroes top three single "Cupid's Chokehold", his first chart success outside the band. Red Rat appeared on Groove Armada's "Get Down", alongside Stush, although he was not officially credit on the single release.

Mutya Buena, formerly of Sugababes, had her first solo top 10 singles in 2007 with "Real Girl" and her featured credit on Groove Armada's "Song 4 Mutya (Out of Control)". Russell Small from Freemasons had previously been a part of the production duo Phats & Small, peaking at numbers 2 and 7 with the singles "Turn Around" (1999) and "Feel Good" (2000) respectively.

Songs from films
Original songs from various films entered the top 10 throughout the year. These included "Signal Fire" (from Spider-Man 3) and "Rule the World" (Stardust). "When You Believe" from The Prince of Egypt was also covered by Leon Jackson as his winning song on The X Factor.

Charity singles
A number of singles recorded for charity reached the top 10 in the charts in 2007. The Comic Relief single was a new version of The Proclaimers hit "(I'm Gonna Be) 500 Miles", featuring Peter Kay and Matt Lucas as their characters Brian Potter (from Phoenix Nights and Andy Pipkin (Little Britain) respectively, peaking at number one on 31 March 2007.

Runrig and the Tartan Army, made up of Scotland football fans, recorded an unofficial Children in Need single for 2007, "Loch Lomond". It reached number nine on 24 November 2007, two places higher than the official Children in Need single, "Headlines (Friendship Never Ends)" by Spice Girls, which missed the top 10. Proceeds from the sales of "Any Dream Will Do" by Lee Mead also went towards Children in Need. The song peaked at number two on 30 June 2007.

Best-selling singles
Leona Lewis had the best-selling single of the year with "Bleeding Love". The single spent eleven weeks in the top 10 (including seven weeks at number one), sold over 787,000 copies and was certified platinum by the BPI. "Umbrella" by Rihanna featuring Jay Z came in second place, selling about 511,000 copies and losing out by around 276,000 sales. Mika's "Grace Kelly", "When You Believe" from Leon Jackson and "Rule the World" by Take That made up the top five. Singles by Sugababes, Timbaland featuring Keri Hilson and D.O.E., The Proclaimers featuring Brian Potter and Andy Pipkin, Mark Ronson featuring Amy Winehouse, and Kaiser Chiefs were also in the top ten best-selling singles of the year.

Top-ten singles
Key

Entries by artist

The following table shows artists who achieved two or more top 10 entries in 2007, including singles that reached their peak in 2006. The figures include both main artists and featured artists, while appearances on ensemble charity records are also counted for each artist. The total number of weeks an artist spent in the top ten in 2007 is also shown.

Notes

 "Crank That" reached its peak of number two on 12 January 2008 (week ending).
 "Chasing Cars" re-entered the top 10 at number 9 on 13 January 2007 (week ending), under new chart rules where a single only needed to be available to download to be eligible for the chart.
 Released as the official single for Comic Relief.
 Nina Persson, the lead singer with The Cardigans, appeared as guest vocalist on "Your Love Alone Is Not Enough", but is uncredited on the record.
 "Heavyweight Champion of the World" re-entered the top 10 at number 10 on 7 July 2007 (week ending).
 Released as the official single for Children in Need.
 Released as an unofficial single for Children in Need. The song charted higher than one of the official Children in Need singles, "Headlines (Friendship Never Ends)" by Spice Girls, which peaked at number 11.
 "All I Want for Christmas" first charted at its original peak of number 2 for three weeks in 1994. It re-entered the top 10 at number 8 on 15 December 2007 (week ending).
 "Fairytale of New York" first charted at its original peak of number 2 for two weeks in 1987. It re-entered the Top 10 on 22 December 2007 (week ending) at number 8.
 Figure includes appearance on Gwen Stefani's "The Sweet Escape".
 Figure includes song that peaked in 2006.
 Figure includes appearance on 50 Cent's "Ayo Technology".
 Figure includes appearance on Timbaland's "Give It to Me".
 Figure includes appearance on Groove Armada's "Song 4 Mutya (Out of Control)".
 Figure includes a top 10 hit with the group Fall Out Boy
 Figure includes appearance on Gym Class Heroes' "Cupid's Chokehold".

See also
2007 in British music
List of number-one singles from the 2000s (UK)

References
General

Specific

External links
2007 singles chart archive at the Official Charts Company (click on relevant week)

United Kingdom Top Ten
2007 in British music
2007